Chaldean Catholic Eparchy of Saint Peter the Apostle is one of two eparchies (Eastern catholic dioceses) of the Chaldean Catholic Church sui iuris (Syro-Oriental Rite, Syriac/Arameic language) in the USA.
 
It is exempt, i.e. immediately subject to the Holy See, not part of any ecclesiastical province.

Its cathedral episcopal see is St. Peter's Chaldean Catholic Cathedral, located in El Cajon, California.

History 
It was created by Pope John Paul II on 21 May 2002 on territory split off from the Chaldean Catholic Eparchy of Saint Thomas the Apostle of Detroit, also exempt, and the only other Chaldean Catholic diocese in the USA.

Episcopal ordinaries
Exempt Eparchs (Bishops)
 Mar Sarhad Yawsip Jammo (May 5, 2002–May 7, 2016)
 (Bawai (Ashur) Soro, listed as Official (2014-2017), appointed Bishop of Mar Addai of Toronto (Chaldean), Canada
 Mar Emanuel Hana Shaleta (August 29, 2017-present)Auxiliary Eparchs''
 Mar Bawai Soro (January 11, 2014 – November 29, 2017)

Extent 
The diocese is responsible for Chaldean Catholics in nineteen states in the western portion of the United States, the largest concentration of these being found in San Diego County, California.

The Eparchy of St. Peter The Apostle comprises four vicariates consisting of its member parishes.

Southern Vicariate 
The parishes of the Southern Vicariate comprise the Southwest of the United States. The Vicar General of the Diocese is Archdeacon Sabri Kejboe.

 St. Peter's Chaldean Catholic Cathedral, El Cajon, California
 St. Michael's Chaldean Catholic Church, El Cajon, California
 St. John the Apostle Chaldean Catholic Church, El Cajon, California
 Holy Family Chaldean Catholic Church, Phoenix,  Arizona
 Mar Auraha Chaldean Catholic Church, Scottsdale, Arizona
 St. Barbara Chaldean Catholic Church, Las Vegas,  Nevada
 St. George Chaldean Catholic Church, Santa Ana, California

Northern Vicariate 
The parishes of the Northern Vicariate comprise the Northwest of the United States. 

 St. Thomas Assyrian Chaldean Catholic Church, Turlock, California
 St. Mary Assyrian Chaldean Catholic Church, Campbell, California
 St. Matthew's Chaldean Catholic Church, Ceres, California
 St. Paul Chaldean and Assyrian Catholic Church, North Hollywood, California
 Our Lady of Perpetual Help Chaldean Assyrian Catholic Church, Orangevale, California

Missions 
The parishes listed here are Missions of the Eparchy located throughout the diocese who are currently not large enough, have not raised enough money, or found the proper land to construct their own church and formally create a parish.

 Holy Cross Chaldean Catholic Mission, Gilbert, Arizona
 Our Lady of Perpetual Help Chaldean Catholic Mission, Tucson, Arizona
 Rabban Hermiz Chaldean Catholic Mission, Riverside, California
 Mar Qardagh Chaldean Catholic Mission, Poway, California
 St Mary Chaldean Catholic Mission, Marina, California
 Holy Spirit Chaldean Catholic Mission, Houston, Texas
 St Joseph Chaldean Catholic Mission, Dallas, Texas

Monasteries, convents and seminaries 
The fourth vicarate comprises the vocational housing of the non-diocesan religious life within the Eparchy.

 St. George Monastery, Riverside, California
 Sons of the Covenant Monastery , El Cajon, California 
 The Seminary of Mar Abba the Great, El Cajon, California
 Chaldean Sisters of the Immaculate Conception, El Cajon, California

See also 
 List of the Catholic bishops of the United States#Other Eastern Catholic bishops
 Roman Catholic Diocese of San Diego

References

Sources and external links 
 Chaldean Catholic Eparchy of Saint Peter the Apostle of San Diego Official Site
 GCatholic.org

Assyrian-American culture in California
Chaldean Catholic Church in the United States
Eastern Catholic dioceses in North America
Iraqi-American history
Saint Peter in San Diego
Catholic Church in California
Eastern Catholicism in California
Saint Peter in San Diego
Saint Peter in San Diego
El Cajon, California
2002 establishments in California